The 1999–2000 season was F.C. Motagua's 49th season in existence and the club's 34th consecutive season in the top fight of Honduran football.  After finishing in third place last season, the club were looking for their 8th and 9th league title.  They also competed in the 1999 UNCAF Interclub Cup.

Overview
After manager Ramón Maradiaga took charge of the Honduras national football team, the club hired Mexican coach José Treviño with whom they were able to win the Apertura tournament.  With the win, Treviño returned to Mexico and assistant coach and former striker Luis Reyes managed to repeat and won the Clausura tournament.  This was the second time in history the club was able to retain the title consecutively, after doing so in 1997–98.  Internationally, Motagua faced Comunicaciones F.C., Juventus FC, C.D. Luis Ángel Firpo and Deportivo Saprissa in the 1999 UNCAF Interclub Cup, but were unable to proceed from the first round.

Players

Results
All times are local CST unless stated otherwise

Apertura

Clausura

UNCAF Interclub Cup

By round

Statistics
 As of 26 August 2000

References

External links
 Official website

F.C. Motagua seasons
Motagua
Motagua